The 2020–21 season was the 94th season in the existence of A.S. Roma and the 69th consecutive season in the top flight of Italian football. In addition to the domestic league, Roma participated in this season's editions of the Coppa Italia and also participated in the UEFA Europa League. The season covered the period from 7 August 2020 to 30 June 2021. This season was the last under head coach Paulo Fonseca, who will be replaced by José Mourinho next season.

Players

First-team squad

Primavera squad

Out on loan

Transfers

In

Out

Loans in

Loans out

Pre-season and friendlies

Competitions

Overview

Note: Serie A match against Hellas Verona originally ended in a 0–0 draw; Coppa Italia match against Spezia originally ended in a 2–4 loss.

Serie A

League table

Results summary

Results by round

Matches
The league fixtures were announced on 2 September 2020.

Coppa Italia

UEFA Europa League

Group stage

The group stage draw was held on 2 October 2020.

Knockout phase

Round of 32
The draw for the round of 32 was held on 14 December 2020.

Round of 16
The draw for the round of 16 was held on 26 February 2021.

Quarter-finals
The draw for the quarter-finals was held on 19 March 2021.

Semi-finals
The draw for the semi-finals was held on 19 March 2021, after the quarter-final draw.

Statistics

Appearances and goals

|-
! colspan=14 style="background:#B21B1C; color:#FFD700; text-align:center"| Goalkeepers

|-
! colspan=14 style="background:#B21B1C; color:#FFD700; text-align:center"| Defenders

|-
! colspan=14 style="background:#B21B1C; color:#FFD700; text-align:center"| Midfielders

|-
! colspan=14 style="background:#B21B1C; color:#FFD700; text-align:center"| Forwards

|-
! colspan=14 style="background:#B21B1C; color:#FFD700; text-align:center"| Players transferred out during the season

Goalscorers

Notes

References

External links

A.S. Roma seasons
Roma
Roma